Lynett Mutokuto (born 1 September 1988) is a Zimbabwean association football defender. She is a member of the Zimbabwe women's national football team and represented the country in their Olympic debut at the 2016 Summer Olympics.

References

Zimbabwe women's international footballers
Footballers at the 2016 Summer Olympics
Olympic footballers of Zimbabwe
Living people
1988 births
Zimbabwean women's footballers
Women's association football defenders